The Jones of Faerdref Uchaf family is a Welsh gentry family from the parish of Llandrillo-yn-Edeirnion, Merionethshire. They are a cadet branch of the Hughes of Gwerclas family, descending from the younger brother of the 7th Baron of Kymmer-yn-Edeirnion, Gruffydd ap Rhys ab Ieuan (d. 1489), 'Baron of Crogen and Branas', who was famed for his pilgrimage to Santiago di Compostella. He was a Lancastrian and later supported his kinsman Henry Tudor. He was a patron of the bards, most notably Lewys Glyn Cothi.

The eponymous ancestor of the family was John ap Rhydderch ap John ap Hywel ap Gruffydd ap Rhys, of Faerdref Uchaf, who appears in the visitations of Wales in 1594. His son, Maurice Jones of Faerdref Uchaf, Esq. (1597- ca. 1655), was the first to adopt the surname 'Jones'. Faerdref Uchaf house no longer exists but would have been a very similar house to the surviving Branas Uchaf and Plas Uchaf. Ty Uchaf was built on its site in the 1680s.

The family, like their kinsmen, were Royalists during the English Civil War, and two of Maurice's sons, Capt. John Jones and Lt. Nathanael Jones, fought at the Battle of Marston Moor, leading a company of men from Llandrillo. Later, Nathanael achieved minor fame as a native Welsh poet and translator of theological textbooks, such as works by Jeremy Taylor from English into Welsh, so that they could be more widely read. He also served as a Justice of the Peace and coroner for Merionethshire, and became High Sheriff of Merionethshire in 1673. His son, Maurice, also served as High Sheriff in 1684.

By the mid-19th century, following the Industrial revolution, the family had largely lost their ancestral lands and had dispersed into the neighbouring counties of Shropshire and Cheshire. An elaborate 18th century memorial tablet to the family remains in the parish church of Llandrillo.

As descendants of Owain Brogyntyn, they bear the 'Black Lion' of Powys on their escutcheon and keep the motto 'Kymmer-yn-Edeirnion', in memory of their ancestral seat. The family frequently intermarried with their kinsmen the Nanney of Nannau family, whom they now represent in the female line. Their arms hang in the hall of Jesus College, Oxford where several members of the family were educated.

References 

Welsh noble families
Gentry families